Urvi Ashar (born October 24, 1983 in Mumbai) is an Indian voice-dubbing actress who speaks English, Hindi, Kutchi, Gujarati and Marathi. She has been active in the voice acting business since 1998.

Filmography

Commercials

Animated films

Dubbing career
She had voiced for television commercials. She specializes in dubbing for young boys, teenage girls and young women.

She is also known as the official Hindi-dubbing voice for south Indian actresses like Tamannaah Bhatia, Shruti Haasan, Kajal Agarwal and Hansika Motwani in most of their Telugu and Tamil films.

Dubbing roles

Live action series

Animated series

Live-action films

Foreign language films

Indian films

Animated films

See also
Dubbing (filmmaking)
List of Indian Dubbing Artists

References

1983 births
Living people
Indian voice actresses
21st-century Indian actresses